Saint Victor de Cambon was a sixth-century hermit.  He lived on an island in the diocese of Nantes, near Pontchateau.  A disciple of Saint Friard d'Indret, Saint Martin de Vertoun or Saint Hermeland d'Indre.  Although the Normans laid waste to his oratory in 878, it continued to be a place of miracles.  His tomb was desecrated during the French Revolution and his relics are lost.  His feast is 31 August.

Source 

 Paul Guerin.  Les petits bollandistes 

Medieval Breton saints